The production of telenovelas in Chile originates in the 1960s and has continued to this day. Los días jóvenes (1967), broadcast by Canal 13, is considered the first telenovela for its format that consists of several episodes with consecutive broadcasts and a long-term plot unlike other television formats. Since then, the production has continued to the present day and they represent one of the main sources of audience in Chilean television.

20th century

1960s

1970s

1980s

1990s

21st century

2000s

2010s

2020s

See also 
 List of Chilean actors
 Cinema of Chile

References

 
Chilean